Matthew Jensen (born April 21, 1992) is an American rugby union player who plays at lock for the Utah Warriors of Major League Rugby (MLR) and the United States men's national team.

Club career
Jensen signed with Major League Rugby's Utah Warriors in for their inaugural 2018 season.

International career

USA Eagles
Jensen was first named to the roster for the USA Eagles ahead of the 2016 end-of-year tests.  Jensen made his debut for the Eagles on November 4, 2016, appearing as a substitute, in an uncapped match against the Māori All Blacks. Jensen earned his first cap for the Eagles on February 4, 2017, starting at lock, in the Eagles' 29–23 victory over Uruguay in the 2017 Americas Rugby Championship (ARC). Jensen scored his first try for the Eagles on February 25, 2017, appearing as a substitute, in a 57–9 victory against Chile in the ARC. , Jensen has made seven total appearances for the club and has scored two total tries.

References

1992 births
Living people
American rugby union players
United States international rugby union players
Rugby union locks
Utah Warriors players